George Ezekial Hood (January 25, 1875 – March 8, 1960) was a politician and former United States Representative from the U.S. state of North Carolina.

Biography
Hood was born near Goldsboro, Wayne County, North Carolina. He attended public schools there and became a telegraph operator.

He studied law and was admitted to the bar of the Supreme Court of North Carolina in 1896 and commenced practice in Goldsboro. 
From 1899 to 1909, he was a captain and subsequently promoted to colonel in the Second Regiment of the North Carolina National Guard. Hood held several local, state and national political offices between 1896 and 1919, including a member of the United States House of Representatives. He then returned to practice law in Goldsboro.

Hood died in Goldsboro and is interred in Willow Dale Cemetery.

Political career
1896–1900 - secretary of the Wayne County Democratic executive committee
1898–1900 - treasurer of Wayne County
1899–1901 - representative in the North Carolina House of Representatives
1901–1907 - mayor of Goldsboro
1912 - his name was presented as a candidate for Congress; he lost out at the nominating convention
March 4, 1915 – March 3, 1919 - elected as a Democrat to the Sixty-fourth and Sixty-fifth Congresses; he was not a candidate for renomination in 1918

References

1875 births
1960 deaths
Democratic Party members of the North Carolina House of Representatives
North Carolina lawyers
People from Goldsboro, North Carolina
National Guard (United States) officers
Democratic Party members of the United States House of Representatives from North Carolina
North Carolina National Guard personnel